Oksana Stepanyuk (June 16, 1977, Ukraine) is a Ukrainian lyric coloratura soprano opera singer at Japan Opera Foundation, Publicity and Goodwill Ambassador, Merited Artist of Ukraine.

Background 
Oksana was born in Syniawa, Rokytne Raion, Kyiv Oblast, Ukraine. Her father Anatoliy Stepanyuk is a military pilot, he can play many musical instruments. Her mother Olga Stepanyuk is an accountant, she has a strong beautiful voice.

In 1992, after graduating from the Rokytne Music School (bandura, vocal and piano class) Oksana entered the Zhytomyr Music College from which she graduated in 1996, receiving a diploma as a bandura player with the best practical score.

In 1996, she entered the orchestral department and in 1998 the department of vocal music at the Petro Tchaikovsky National Music Academy of Ukraine and continued her music studies with an opera singer Evgeniya Miroshnichenko and bandura player Serhiy Bashtan.

While studying at Music Academy, Oksana made her professional concert tour debut in France, Italy, Iran, and Germany.

Oksana made a recording with orchestra and bandura for National Radio Company of Ukraine and made her professional debut as Marfa in The Tsar's Bride by Rimsky-Korsakov.

Among her teachers were Serhiy Bashtan, Evgeniya Miroshnichenko, Margherita Guglielmi.

Since 2010 Oksana has been a member of the Japan Opera Foundation.

During her career in Japan, Oksana has given more than 700 performances all over Japan, including her recitals in Tokyo Metropolitan Theatre, Kioi Hall, Oji Hall, Tokyo Bunka Kaikan Hall, Nikkei Hall, Osaka Izumi Hall, Kamakura Performing Art Center, Matsumoto Kissei Bunka Hall etc.

Oksana has given countless charity concerts for Ukraine, Japan, Cambodia, Sri Lanka, and the Philippines.

Career in Japan 
 2013 – Asian debut as Oscar in Verdi's Un ballo in maschera
 2014 – debut as Micaela in Bizet's Carmen
 2015 – performed Oscar in Verdi's opera Un ballo in maschera
 2016 – made her debut as Violetta Valery in Verdi's La traviata
 2016 – made her debut as Gilda in Verdi's Rigoletto
 2017 – started her work at Japan Opera Association
 2018 – debut as an actress in the drama Yuzuru, title role Tsu
 2018 – made her debut as Lora in Mascagni's Cavalleria rusticana
 2020 – sung Verdi's opera La Traviata as Violetta Valery in Tokyo Metropolitan Theatre
 2021 – debut as Musetta in Puccini's La bohème

Awards and honors  
 1992 – Laureate of the competition Young talents of Kyiv Oblast, Ukraine
 1998 – The first prize and laureate of the International Competition for folk instrument musicians, Kharkiv, Ukraine
 1999 – Laureate of the competition New Name of Ukraine, Kyiv
 2001 – The first and third prizes at the International Competition Festival, Pskov, Russia
 2002 – The first prize at the International contest Music World, Fivizzano, Italy
 2009 – The best new artist at the 42nd Young Musicians Audition, Tokyo, Japan
 2009 – The second prize at the Bruckcart International Music Competition (first prize no one), Tokyo, Japan
 2010 – The first prize at the Banri no Choujou International Music Competition, Tokyo, Japan
 2011 – The first prize at the 22nd Audition, Tokyo, Japan
 2011 — Merited Artist of Ukraine
 2011 – The first prize at the Yokohama International Music Competition
 2013 – The first prize at the Czech Music Competition
 2014 – Grand Prix and Gold Medal at the FUGA International Music Competition
 2019 – Second price at the Margherita Guglielmi Vocal Competition and special prize from prima donna La Scala
 2019 – Publicity and Goodwill Ambassador

References

External links 
 Oksana Stepanyuk How beautiful are the feet (video)
 Oksana Stepanyuk Дніпровський вальс (video)
 Oksana Stepanyuk Nightingale (video)
 Oksana Stepanyuk Ave Maria (video)
 Oksana Stepanyuk on Japan TV, Interview 2020 (video)

1975 births
Living people
Kyiv Conservatory alumni
Recipients of the title of Merited Artist of Ukraine
21st-century Japanese women opera singers
Japanese-language singers
Ukrainian emigrants to Japan